Ernest York (died 28 April 1917) was an English professional footballer who played as a full back in the Southern Football League for Crystal Palace.

Personal life
York served as a private in the Royal Berkshire Regiment during the First World War and was killed in action at Salonika on 28 April 1917. He is commemorated on the Doiran Memorial.

Career statistics

References

Year of birth unknown
People from West Northamptonshire District
Sportspeople from Northamptonshire
Association football fullbacks
English footballers
Southern Football League players
Kettering Town F.C. players
Crystal Palace F.C. players
1917 deaths